Leo Larson was an American cyclist. He competed in the men's half mile event at the 1904 Summer Olympics.

References

External links
 

Year of birth missing
Year of death missing
American male cyclists
Olympic cyclists of the United States
Cyclists at the 1904 Summer Olympics
Place of birth missing